The 1836–37 United States Senate elections were held on various dates in various states. As these U.S. Senate elections were prior to the ratification of the Seventeenth Amendment in 1913, senators were chosen by state legislatures. Senators were elected over a wide range of time throughout 1836 and 1837, and a seat may have been filled months late or remained vacant due to legislative deadlock. In these elections, terms were up for the senators in Class 3.

In this election cycle, the Jacksonian coalition emerged as the Democratic Party, and the Adams, or Anti-Jackson, coalition emerged as the Whig Party.

Results summary 
Senate party division, 25th Congress (1837–1839)

 Majority party: Democratic (35)
 Minority party: Whig (17–16)
 Other parties: (0–1)
 Total seats: 52

Change in composition

Before the special elections

As a result of the special elections

Before the regular elections

As a result of the regular elections 

"Hold" means the incumbent lost and the winner was from an affiliated new party, either Anti-Jacksonian to Whig or Jacksonian to Democratic.

Beginning of the next Congress

Race summaries 
Bold states link to specific election articles.

Elections seated during the 24th Congress 
In these elections, senators were elected to finish terms already in progress either as special elections or as elections to a new state. senators were seated during 1836 or before March 4, 1837; ordered by election date.

Races leading to the 25th Congress 

In these regular elections, the winner was seated on March 4, 1837; ordered by state.

All of the elections involved the Class 3 seats.

Elections during the 25th Congress 
In these special elections, the winners were seated in 1837 after March 4; ordered by election date.

Alabama 
There were two elections in Alabama in this cycle, both for the same seat.

Alabama (regular) 

First-term senator Anti-Jacksonian Gabriel Moore lost re-election in November 1836 to Jacksonian John McKinley.

Alabama (special) 

Shortly after the new term started, Jacksonian-now-Democrat John McKinley resigned to become Associate Justice of the U.S. Supreme Court.  He was replaced by fellow Democrat Clement C. Clay in a June 19, 1837 special election.

Clay would serve only until November 15, 1841, when he, too, resigned.

Arkansas 

Arkansas became a new state and elected its two senators September 18, 1836.

Jacksonian former Governor of Arkansas Territory William Fulton was elected to the Class 2 seat, with the term ending March 3, 1841.

Jacksonian former delegate Ambrose Sevier was elected  to the Class 3 seat, with the term ending March 3, 1837.

Sevier was also re-elected in 1837 to the next term that would end in 1843.

Connecticut

Delaware

Georgia 
There were two elections in Georgia in this cycle.

Georgia (regular)

Georgia (special)

Illinois

Indiana

Kentucky

Louisiana 
There were two elections in Louisiana in this cycle, both for the same seat.

Anti-Jacksonian Alexander Porter resigned January 5, 1837 due to ill health.

Louisiana (special) 

Jacksonian Alexandre Mouton was elected January 12, 1837 to finish Porter's term, ending March 3, 1837.

Louisiana (regular) 

Jacksonian Alexandre Mouton was also elected as a Democrat in 1837 (possibly re-elected) to the next term, beginning March 4, 1837.

Maryland

Maryland (special) 

Anti-Jacksonian Robert Henry Goldsborough died October 5, 1836. Anti-Jacksonian John S. Spence was elected in late 1836 to finish Goldsborough's term, ending March 3, 1837.

Maryland (regular) 

John S. Spence won election to a full term an unknown margin of votes, for the Class 3 seat.

Missouri

New Hampshire

New York 

Silas Wright Jr., had been elected in 1833 to this seat after the resignation of William L. Marcy who had been elected Governor of New York. Wright's term would expire on March 3, 1837.

At the State election in November 1836, 94 Democrats and 34 Whigs were elected to the Assembly, and seven of the eight State senators elected were Democrats. The 60th New York State Legislature met from January 3 to May 16, 1837, at Albany. The party strength in the Assembly as shown by the election for Speaker was: 80 for Democrat Edward Livingston and 27 for Whig Luther Bradish.

Wright was re-nominated in a Democratic caucus by a large majority. Silas Wright Jr., was the choice of both the Assembly and the Senate, and was declared elected.

North Carolina 
There were two elections in North Carolina in this cycle, both for the same seat.

Anti-Jacksonian Willie P. Mangum resigned November 26, 1836.

North Carolina (special) 

Jacksonian Robert Strange was elected in late 1836 to finish Mangum's term, ending March 3, 1837.

North Carolina (regular) 

Jacksonian Robert Strange was also elected as a Democrat in 1836, to the next term, beginning March 4, 1837.

Ohio

Pennsylvania 

The Pennsylvania General Assembly convened on December 14, 1836, to elect a Senator to serve the term beginning on March 4, 1837. The results of the vote of both houses combined are as follows:

|- bgcolor ="#EEEEEE"
| colspan =3 align="right" | Totals
| align ="right" | 133
| align ="right" | 100.00%

|}

South Carolina

Vermont

Virginia (special) 

There were three special elections in Virginia in this cycle.

Virginia (special, class 1) 

Two-term Anti-Jacksonian (and future President) John Tyler resigned February 29, 1836 due to policial differences and conflict with the Virginia House of Delegates, which had come under control of the rival Jacksonians.

Former Jacksonian senator William C. Rives (who had served in the class 2 seat from December 10, 1832 to February 22, 1834) was elected March 4, 1836 to finish Tyler's term that would end March 3, 1839.

Virginia (special, class 2 1836) 

Anti-Jacksonian Benjamin W. Leigh, who had served in the seat since an 1834 special election and re-elected in 1835, resigned July 4, 1836 to return to his private legal practice.

Jacksonian Richard E. Parker was elected December 12, 1836, but he would only remain in the seat for four months.

Virginia (special, class 2 1837) 

Parker, now a Democrat, was elected to the Virginia Supreme Court of Appeals and so he resigned from the Senate March 13, 1837.

Fellow Democrat William H. Roane was elected March 14, 1837 to finish the term that would end March 3, 1841.

See also 
 1836 United States elections
 1836 United States presidential election
 1836–37 United States House of Representatives elections
 24th United States Congress
 25th United States Congress

Notes

References 

 Party Division in the Senate, 1789-Present, via Senate.gov